Rosamond Marshall (October 17, 1902 – November 13, 1957) was an American novelist. She wrote historical romances for adult and youth readers during the 1940s and 1950s, and two of her novels, Kitty and The Bixby Girls, were made into motion pictures.

Early life 
Marshall was born Rosamond van der Zee Botsford on October 17, 1893, New York City, New York,  the daughter of Charles and Florence (née Topping Botsford).

Career 
Her first published novel in English, None But the Brave, A Story of Holland (1942), for young people, won the New York Herald Tribune Spring Book Award.

Rosamond Marshall's novels for young people were overshadowed by the success of her historical romances for adults. The first of these, Kitty, set the pattern for a continuing series of novels which had sales (in paperback reprints) ranging from a million and a half to three million by 1942.

Two of Rosamond's novels were made into motion pictures. The film, Kitty (1945), starred Ray Milland and Paulette Goddard, while All the Fine Young Cannibals (1960) was based on her book The Bixby Girls, and starred Robert Wagner, Natalie Wood, and George Hamilton.

Personal life
While in Turin, Italy she met and married an Italian, Pierro Antonio Gariazzo on December 26, 1914, and lived for a time in Rome. After divorcing Gariazzo, she married Albert Earl Marshall of New York City, USA, on August 10, 1936.

Death
In later life, Rosamond divided her time between Southern California and her Vancouver Island, Canada farm. She died on November 13, 1957.

Bibliography
Published works by Rosamond Marshall:

 (NB this has also been referred to as The Doll Master)

References

Sources
The New York Times p30 N 26’57 (Obituary)
 Current Biography 1942 page 575 which lists the following (New York Herald Tribune Books p8 My 10'42 pors Pub W 141:1768-9 My 9 '42 por)
 Current Biography 1957 page 273
Twentieth Century Authors, First supplement, Edited by Stanley J. Kunitz, Assistant editor Vineta Colby 1955 pages 645-646

1902 births
1957 deaths
20th-century American novelists
American women novelists
People from Vancouver Island
20th-century American women writers
20th-century American screenwriters